Polygrammodes senahuensis is a moth in the family Crambidae. It was described by Herbert Druce in 1895. It is found in Guatemala.

The forewings and hindwings are cream coloured with reddish-brown veins and fine lines crossing the wings from the costal to the inner margin. The marginal line is dark brown.

References

Spilomelinae
Moths described in 1895
Moths of Central America